Attorney General Ingersoll may refer to:

Jared Ingersoll (1749–1822), Attorney General of Pennsylvania
Robert G. Ingersoll (1833–1899), Attorney General of Illinois